FOD may refer to:

Music

 F.O.D. (band), a Belgian punk rock band
 "F.O.D. (Fuck of Death)", a song by Canadian extreme metal band Slaughter
 Flag of Democracy, an American hardcore punk band
 "F.O.D.", a song on Green Day's album Dookie

Other uses 
 The F.O.D. Control Corporation
 Foodo language, spoken in Benin
 Ford railway station, in England
 Foreign object damage, damage to aircraft caused by debris
 Fort Dodge Regional Airport, in Iowa, United States
 Framework-oriented design
 Friend of Dorothy, a term for a gay man
 Funny or Die, an American comedy production company
 Films on demand; see video on demand